Leccinum scabrum, commonly known as the rough-stemmed bolete, scaber stalk, and birch bolete, is an edible mushroom in the family Boletaceae, and was formerly classified as Boletus scaber. The birch bolete is widespread in Europe, in the Himalayas in Asia, and elsewhere in the Northern Hemisphere, occurring only in mycorrhizal association with birch trees. It fruits from June to October. This mushroom is also becoming increasingly common in Australia and New Zealand where it is likely introduced.

Description

At first, it is hemispherical, and later becomes flatter. The skin of the cap is tan or brownish, usually with a lighter edge; it is smooth, bald, and dry to viscid.

The pores are whitish at a young age, later gray. In older specimens, the pores on the pileus can bulge out, while around the stipe they dent in strongly. The pore covering is easy to remove from the skin of the pileus.

The basic mycelium is white.

The flesh is whitish, sometimes darkening following exposure. In young specimens, the meat is relatively firm, but it very soon becomes spongy and holds water, especially in rainy weather. When cooked, the meat of the birch bolete turns black.

Leccinum scabrum has been found in association with ornamental birch trees planted outside of its native range, such as in California.

Habitat and distribution
Leccinum scabrum is a European species that has been introduced to various areas of the world, mostly appearing in urban areas. In New Zealand, it associates solely with Betula pendula.

Uses
The birch bolete is edible but considered not to be worthwhile by some guides. It can be pickled in brine or vinegar. It is used also in mixed mushroom dishes, fried or steamed.
It is commonly harvested for food in Finland and Russia.

A few reports in North America (New England and the Rocky Mountains) after 2009 suggest that Leccinums (birch boletes) should only be consumed with much caution.

Similar species
Several different species of Leccinum mushrooms are found in mycorrhiza with birches, and can be confused by amateurs and mycologists alike. L. variicolor has a bluish stipe. L. oxydabile has firmer, pinkish flesh and a different pileus skin structure. L. melaneum is darker in color and has yellowish hues under the skin of the pileus and stipe. L. holopus is paler and whitish in all parts.

See also
List of Leccinum species
List of North American boletes

References

Further reading 
Kallenbach: Die Röhrlinge (Boletaceae), Leipzig, Klinkhardt, (1940–42)
Gerhardt, Ewald: Pilze. Band 2: Röhrlinge, Porlinge, Bauchpilze, Schlauchpilze und andere, (Spektrum der Natur BLV Intensiv), (1985)

External links

 Pilzgalerie: Leccinum scabrum (Birkenpilz)

scabrum
Edible fungi
Fungi described in 1783
Fungi of Europe
Fungi of New Zealand
Fungi of North America
Taxa named by Jean Baptiste François Pierre Bulliard